Miloslav Kodl (12 August 1928 – 3 December 1985) was a Czech basketball player. He competed in the men's tournament at the 1952 Summer Olympics.

References

1928 births
1985 deaths
Czech men's basketball players
Olympic basketball players of Czechoslovakia
Basketball players at the 1952 Summer Olympics
Place of birth missing